Manuel Vidal Hermosa (15 October 1901 – 17 June 1965) was a Spanish footballer whose position was goalkeeper. He gained his only international cap on 22 May 1927 in a 4–1 friendly win over France at the Stade Olympique Yves-du-Manoir, as an Athletic Bilbao player. He also played for FC Barcelona, Atlético Madrid and Gimnástico FC (Valencia).

References
 
 
 

1901 births
1965 deaths
Spanish footballers
Footballers from Bilbao
Association football goalkeepers
Spain international footballers
Athletic Bilbao footballers
FC Barcelona players
Atlético Madrid footballers
La Liga players
Segunda División players